Acraephnes is a moth genus of the family Depressariidae.

Species
 Acraephnes cryeropis (Turner, 1947)
 Acraephnes innubila (Turner, 1927)
 Acraephnes inscripta (Turner, 1947)
 Acraephnes litodes (Turner, 1947)
 Acraephnes nitida Turner, 1947
 Acraephnes nivea Turner, 1947
 Acraephnes sulfurata (Meyrick, 1907)

References

 
Hypertrophinae
Moth genera